Atractaspis fallax, also known as the Peters' burrowing asp, eastern small-scaled burrowing asp, and mole viper, is a species of venomous snake in the family Lamprophiidae. It is found in East Africa, specifically in South Sudan (near the Ugandan border), Ethiopia, Somalia, Kenya, and extreme northern Tanzania.

References

Atractaspididae
Snakes of Africa
Reptiles of Ethiopia
Reptiles of Kenya
Reptiles of Somalia
Reptiles of South Sudan
Reptiles of Tanzania
Reptiles described in 1867
Taxa named by Wilhelm Peters